Mystery Science Theater 3000: The Movie is a 1996 American science fiction comedy film and a film adaptation of the television series Mystery Science Theater 3000, produced and set between the series' sixth and seventh seasons. It was distributed by Universal Pictures and Gramercy Pictures and produced by Best Brains.

The filmmakers dub a new comic narrative over the 1955 sci-fi film This Island Earth, editing out approximately 30 minutes of the original film.

Plot

The film opens with mad scientist Dr. Clayton Forrester, working from an underground laboratory, explaining the premise of the film (and associated series). Mike Nelson and the robots Crow T. Robot and Tom Servo, along with Gypsy, are aboard the Satellite of Love high in Earth's orbit, when Forrester forces them to watch the film This Island Earth to break their wills; as in the television series, Mike, Crow and Tom riff the film as it plays.

The film-riffing scenes are book-ended and interspersed with short, unrelated sketches:
 In the introduction, Crow attempts to dig through the ship's hull to return to Earth. 
 Crow and Tom dare Mike to drive the Satellite himself, but he ends up crashing into the Hubble Space Telescope.
 Tom reveals that he has an "interocitor" like that used in This Island Earth. The gang tries to use Tom's device to return to Earth, but they instead contact a Metalunan (the alien race from the film) who is unable to help them to figure out how to use it correctly but does accidentally repeatedly zap Tom's head with a laser beam.
 After This Island Earth finishes, Mike, Crow, and Tom are nowhere near broken and are having a party on the satellite. Furious at his failure, Forrester attempts to use his own interocitor to harm them, but only succeeds in transporting himself into the shower of the Metalunan previously seen.
 During the credits, the film breaks the fourth wall as the crew returns to the theater and riffs on MST3k: The Movie's ending credits.

Cast
 Michael J. Nelson as Mike Nelson
 Trace Beaulieu as Crow T. Robot / Dr. Clayton Forrester
 Kevin Murphy as Tom Servo
 Jim Mallon as Gypsy
 John Brady as Benkitnorf

Production
In 1994, a distribution deal with Paramount Pictures was in negotiations but fell through when the studio wanted to explore the characters' backstories instead of heckling on movies. Universal studio executives attended the series' "ConventioCon ExpoFest-O-Rama" in 1994, where the cast performed a live riff on This Island Earth, a Universal production. Universal Pictures agreed to distribute the film through Gramercy Pictures. The film was shot away from the Best Brains corporate headquarters and studio in Eden Prairie, Minnesota, at Energy Park Studios in St. Paul.

Deleted scenes
 At the beginning of the film, it was originally planned  to have a new version of the "MST3K Love Theme" by Dave Alvin, but the song was reduced to an instrumental version over the end credits.
 To trim the film's duration, Gramercy ordered one of the host segments to be cut. In this scene, Mike and the bots hide out in the ship's storm shelter to avoid a meteor shower. The barrage of meteors threatens to damage the ship's oxygen supply, and Crow, Servo and Gypsy rush to save Mike's life.
 The ending was also changed – originally, the film's final moments depicted Mike and the bots exacting revenge on Forrester by hooking up Servo's interocitor to the video feed from the Hexfield Viewscreen and sending a Metalunan mutant (played by MST3K prop man and toolmaster Jef Maynard) to strangle the mad scientist. At the end, Crow goes back to the basement to plan another escape attempt, this time armed with the chainsaw that he found in Servo's room earlier in the film.
 The new theme song, cut scene and alternate ending were shown at the 1996 "Mystery Science Theater 3000 ConventioCon ExpoFest-O-Rama 2: Electric Bugaloo", but were not included on home media releases until the Shout! Factory Collector's Edition.

Release

Box office
Mystery Science Theater 3000: The Movie was released on April 19, 1996 in only 26 theaters, grossing $206,328, a $7,935 per theater average. It went on to gross $1,007,306.

Critical reception
The film received generally positive reviews from critics. On review aggregator website Rotten Tomatoes, the film holds an 80% rating, based on 54 reviews, with an average rating of 6.6/10. The site's consensus states: "Mystery Science Theater 3000: The Movie may be thin and uneven, but it's hilarious in enough of the right spots to do the show's big-screen transition justice."

Home media
The film was released on VHS by MCA/Universal Home Video to rental outlets on October 1, 1996. The film was released for retail sales on April 8, 1997 on both VHS and Laserdisc formats. MST3K: The Movie was released on DVD in 1998 by Image Entertainment, as a discount title with an MSRP of $14.99.

Universal re-released the DVD on May 6, 2008 through their Rogue Pictures subsidiary. The film is in anamorphic widescreen, and includes an upgraded Dolby Digital 5.1 soundtrack, with English subtitles, a first for an MST3K DVD, and an alternate French language track that is noticeably different from the original English one, as many of the pop culture references that the show was famous for did not translate well overseas and had to be replaced.

It was announced on June 7, 2013 that Shout! Factory would be releasing MST3K: The Movie on a Blu-ray/DVD combo pack Collector's Edition. This release included, for the first time, the deleted scenes from the film.

See also
 List of films featuring space stations

References

External links

 
 
 
 Excerpt posted by film's cinematographer Jeff Stonehouse on Vimeo

1996 films
1990s science fiction comedy films
1996 independent films
American science fiction comedy films
American independent films
American space adventure films
American robot films
1990s English-language films
Films based on television series
Puppet films
Films set in a movie theatre
Films set in the future
Films shot in Minnesota
Mad scientist films
Gramercy Pictures films
Universal Pictures films
Mystery Science Theater 3000
1996 comedy films
1990s American films